Carl Julius Bernhard Börner (28 May 1880 – 14 June 1953) was a German entomologist.

Börner was born in Bremen and died in Naumburg. His collections of Collembola are located in the Natural History Museum, London and the Deutsches Entomologisches Institut in Müncheberg. He also is known to have formally described 43 plants.

References

External links
 

German entomologists
German taxonomists
1880 births
1953 deaths
Scientists from Bremen
20th-century German zoologists